Dark Shadows: The House of Despair is a Big Finish Productions audio drama based on the long-running American horror soap opera series Dark Shadows.

Plot 
Quentin Collins returns to his home to find an unwanted guest...

Cast
Quentin Collins – David Selby
Angelique – Lara Parker
Willie Loomis – John Karlen
Maggie Evans – Kathryn Leigh Scott
Ed Griffin – Jamison Selby
Susan Griffin – Ursula Burton
Mr Strix – Andrew Collins
Voice – Steven Wickham
Voice – Kellie Ryan
Patron – Scott Alan Woodard

External links
 Dark Shadows: The House of Despair

House of Despair
2006 audio plays